One UI is a user interface developed by Samsung Electronics for its Android devices running Android 9 "Pie" and later. Succeeding Samsung Experience and TouchWiz, it is designed to make using larger smartphones easier and be more visually appealing. To provide more clarity, some elements of the UI are tweaked to match colors that are based on the color of the user's phone. It was announced at Samsung's developer conference in 2018, and was unveiled in Galaxy Unpacked in February 2019 alongside the Galaxy S10 series, Galaxy Buds and the Galaxy Fold.

It is also the software layer for their smartwatch Tizen and Wear OS platform, which Samsung co-developed with Google. As of 2021, it is also the software layer for the Microsoft Windows platform on Galaxy Book devices.

Features 
One UI was designed as part of a goal to make Samsung's hardware and software "work together in perfect harmony" and provide a more "natural" experience on large-screen smartphones. One UI displays most of the features that were in the Samsung Experience UX. A prominent design pattern in many of Samsung's system applications is to intentionally place common features and user interface elements along the middle of the screen rather than near the top. This makes them easier to reach with a user's thumb when using the device one-handed.

For similar reasons, apps utilise large headers to push their main content towards the vertical centre of the screen. The navigation bar supports the use of gestures and the usual 3-button system, while a system-wide "night mode" was also added (which gives UI elements and supported applications a darkened color scheme). As with Android Pie upstream, the Overview screen of recent apps uses a horizontal layout, as opposed to the vertical layout of previous versions.

Version history

One UI 1
One UI 1.0, over Android 9 "Pie", is the first version of One UI, brought about many features which were becoming increasingly popular among various apps and iOS. First and foremost, dark mode was added to make viewing in dark spaces easier on the user's eyes. This feature was included in many apps and eventually brought to iOS 13 and Android 10. The first version also brought native screenshot editing tools, refined curves, refinements to the Always-On Display (tap to show), an upgraded Bixby with support for remapping the Bixby button, and a new way to navigate the device: gestures released on February 20, 2019.

While Android 9 “Pie” did come with gesture support, it was only available on Pixel devices and stock AOSP devices and is said to be 'half baked' by many users. However, Samsung decided to create their own gesture system to navigate devices with One UI installed. To achieve this, the user has to swipe up from the bottom of the device in the three locations of the 'buttons' to navigate. The gesture system has received mixed reviews. One UI 1.0 was released on 7 November 2018. 

One UI 1.1, a minor update for One UI, brought a few camera, fingerprint, and facial recognition stability fixes and performance optimizations. This update isn't available on the Galaxy S8, Note 8, S9, and Note 9 range, but was an OTA update for the Galaxy S10 series devices. It launched with the 2019 Galaxy A series devices, such as the A30, A50 and A70 on 21 May 2019.

One UI 1.5, another minor update, was primarily for Galaxy Smart Watches, however, does provide native Link to Windows support. It launched with the Galaxy Note10 series devices on 23 August 2019.

One UI 2 
One UI 2.0, the second generation update to One UI (powered by Android 10), provides Galaxy users with a skinned Digital Wellbeing experience, a more refined UI in some default apps such as Device Care, a minor UI change to the clock position in quick settings, a native screen recorder, the new Android 10 gesture system, Dynamic Lock Screen (different wallpaper with every unlock), a Trash folder in Files, native Android Auto, and harder Location permission access. One UI 2.0 has already rolled out to Galaxy S10, Note 10, Galaxy S9, and Note 9 on 3 December 2019.

One UI 2.1, a minor update for One UI 2.0 released, brings support for Galaxy devices that support 120 Hz refresh rate, Quick Share, Music Share, additional camera modes, and native support for Live Captions. It was first released with the Galaxy S20 series & the Galaxy Z Flip. It also arrived for other devices such as the Galaxy S9 and S10, Note 9 and Note 10, the Galaxy Fold, and select Galaxy A (2020) devices as a software update on February 24, 2020.

One UI 2.5, another minor update in the One UI 2.0 series, was initially released on 21 August 2020 with the launch of the Galaxy Note 20 series, with the update later being released for the Galaxy S20 series along with older Samsung phones. One UI 2.5 doesn't bring radical changes to the UI, but there are plenty of new feature additions to the camera, DeX, gesture navigation, and other services.

One UI 3 
One UI 3.0, based on Android 11, was released for Galaxy S20 devices beginning on 2 December 2020. The update includes a few noteworthy revisions, such as a translucent notification panel, brief notifications, new volume controls positioned on the right or left of the device alongside the physical volume keys, slightly enhanced widgets, and smoother animations and transitions throughout the whole UI.

One UI 3.1, a minor update for One UI 3, first released with the Galaxy S21 series, has started rolling out to other supported Galaxy devices, starting with the Galaxy S20 series on 17 February 2021. There are no notable user interface changes. It contains many new camera feature improvements such as improved touch autofocus and auto exposure controller and improved Single Take feature and software implementations such as Object Eraser, Multi Mic Recording, Eye Comfort Shield, Private Share and others.

One UI 3.1.1, a minor update for One UI 3 on 31 August 2021, first released with the Galaxy Z Fold 3 on 11 August 2021.

One UI 4 
One UI 4.0, based on Android 12, is the fourth generation of One UI. It was released to the Galaxy S21 Series on 15 November 2021. One UI 4.0 focuses on customization, privacy, and access to Samsung's expanding ecosystem.

One UI 4.1, a minor update for One UI 4.0, was first released with the Samsung Galaxy S22 series. It brought minor changes, however it did introduce features like Smart Calendar, added option to choose how much virtual RAM is desired (from 2, 4, 6 or 8 GB), redesigned palette picker, Smart Widgets, separate Left/Right audio balance, extra brightness toggle, Pro Mode on more cameras, Night Mode portraits, and other minor changes.

One UI 4.1.1, based on Android 12L (not to be confused with Android 12), is a minor update for One UI 4.0 on August 23, 2022. Galaxy Z Series, Galaxy Tab S6 Series, Galaxy Tab S7 Series, and Galaxy Tab S8 Series. This update brought with it more enhancements to multitasking and optimizations for foldable smartphones (Galaxy Z Fold line) and large screen tablets (Galaxy Tab line).

One UI 5  
One UI 5.0, announced on 12 October 2022, based on Android 13, is the fifth-generation version of One UI. It is released publicly on 24 October 2022 for Samsung's Samsung Galaxy S22 series along with several other models, like the Samsung Galaxy Z Flip 4 and Samsung Galaxy Z Fold 4, with the update coming to older models later.

Some features and changes include the ability to turn off the RAM Plus feature, where previously users could only limit it to 2GB rather than turning it off entirely, and a redesigned way of customizing the lock screen, similar to iOS 16. Material You was also expanded to most of Google and samsung apps along with some third-party apps that support material you, allowing more ways to customize One UI. One UI 5 also brings refreshed icons for a more-refined look across the UI.

One UI 5.1, a minor update of One UI 5.0, which it is pre-installed in Samsung Galaxy S23 series. Announced on 1 February 2023 and was released on 13 February 2023.

Release

One UI 1 
One UI 1.0 based on Android 9 “Pie” was periodically released to the Galaxy S8, Note 8, S9, and Note 9 devices throughout January, February, March and April 2019. Newer Galaxy A and M devices also have the new Samsung skin as does the Note FE (Fan Edition). One UI 1.1 was released alongside the Galaxy S10 series, Galaxy A series and Galaxy Fold.

One UI 1.5 was pre-installed on the Galaxy Note 10 devices after Samsung's partnership with Microsoft to bring better mobile integration to Windows 10. While the Galaxy S7 series and Note 5 devices did not officially receive the update from Samsung, many developers in the Open Source community have ported the system to these devices.

One UI 2 
One UI 2.0 update from Android 10 from Galaxy S9 series, Galaxy Note 9, Galaxy S10 series and Galaxy A series, However the Galaxy S10 Lite and Note 10 Lite from pre-installed launched One UI 2.0 devices.

One UI 2.1 is stable for the S10, Note 10, S9, Note 9, and Tab S6 devices. It was pre-installed on the Samsung Galaxy S20 and most Samsung devices released in 2020.

One UI 2.5 is pre-installed on the Galaxy Note 20 devices, as well as the Galaxy Z Fold 2 and the Samsung Galaxy S20 FE.

One UI 3 
One UI 3.0 was updated on the Galaxy S20 devices in December 2020. It was released on other devices between January 2021 and August 2021. 

One UI 3.1 is pre-installed on the Galaxy S21 devices, and most Samsung devices released between February to August 2021.

One UI 3.1.1 is pre-installed on the Galaxy Z Fold 3 and Galaxy Z Flip 3 devices.

One UI 4 
One UI 4.0 was released publicly on the Galaxy S21 devices in November 2021, with the update being released for older devices between December 2021 and August 2022.

One UI 4.1 is pre-installed on the Galaxy S22 devices and Samsung Galaxy Tab S8 devices.

One UI 4.1.1 is pre-installed on the Samsung Galaxy Z Fold 4 & Samsung Galaxy Z Flip 4 devices.

One UI 5 
One UI 5.0 was released publicly on the Galaxy S22 devices in October 2022.

One UI 5.1 is pre-installed on the Galaxy S23 series devices.

Update support 
As of 9 February 2022, Samsung offers up to four years of One UI and operating system updates and five years of security updates for flagship devices sold in 2021 and later, and mid range devices sold in 2022 and later.

2021–present 
This includes devices released after those listed below.

 Galaxy S21 series and later devices
 Galaxy Z Fold 3, Z Flip 3, and later devices
 Galaxy A3x series (A33 and later), A5x series (A53 and later), and A7x series (A73 and later)
 Galaxy Tab S8 series and later tablets
 Galaxy Watch 4 series and later watches
 Galaxy Book laptops sold in 2021 and later. They will receive security updates for 18 months after the last major Windows feature update supported for that device.

2019–2021 
As of 5 August 2020, Samsung offers up to three years of One UI and operating system updates and four years of security updates for these following devices.

 Galaxy S10 and S20 series
 Galaxy Note 10 and Note 20 series
 Galaxy Z Fold, Z Fold 2, and Z Flip
 Galaxy A90, A51, A71, A52, and A72
 Galaxy Tab S6 and Tab S7 series

Supported languages 
As of October 2022, Samsung Galaxy devices support many languages, depending on the region and type of device.

Legend 
For the following table, the column ROW (Rest of World) includes all Wi-Fi only variants sold in the USA, Canada, and Korea, as well as most Samsung Galaxy devices sold in Indonesia.

Devices running One UI

Smartphones

Tablets

Computers

Watches

References 

Android (operating system) software
Custom Android firmware
Mobile operating systems
Samsung software